The Panzer-Selbstfahrlafette II , or in full, 7.5 cm Kanone L/41 auf Zugkraftwagen 5t (HKp 902), was a half-track German tank destroyer used during World War II. Only two prototypes were built and sent to North Africa for troop trials. Neither survived the war.

Design and description 
Development began in 1936 when Büssing-NAG was given a contract to develop an advanced half-track chassis with a rear-mounted engine specifically designed for use as a tank destroyer. Four prototypes of the HKp 902 chassis were built, two of which had Rheinmetall-Borsig's  L/40.8 gun mounted in an open-topped, low-profile turret.

The gun had an elevation range between −8° and +20°. It fired a  K.Gr. rot Pz. It carried 35 rounds on board.

Service history 
The two prototypes were completed in 1941 and they were organized into a platoon for troop trials with Panzerjäger-Abteilung ("Anti-Tank Battalion") 605 of the Afrika Korps. The first vehicle was reported received on 17 January 1942 by Panzerjäger-Abteilung 605, but the second was not reported as arrived in Tripoli until 23 February 1942. The platoon was transferred to the Kampfstaffel des Oberbefehlshaber Panzerarmee Afrika (Rommel's personal battle group) on 8 March 1942. Only one vehicle was reported operational on 25 May at the start of Operation Venezia during the Battle of Gazala; the other had been captured by the British, shown in undated photographs. Shortly afterwards, on 5 June, the Kampfstaffel reported that the other vehicle had been lost after knocking out three tanks. No further references were made to the Pz.Sfl. II.

References

Sources
 Chamberlain, Peter, & Doyle, Hilary L. Thomas L. Jentz (Technical Editor). Encyclopedia of German Tanks of World War Two: A Complete Illustrated Directory of German Battle Tanks, Armoured Cars, Self-propelled Guns, and Semi-tracked Vehicles, 1933–1945. London: Arms and Armour Press, 1978 (revised edition 1993). 
 Jentz, Thomas L. Panzerjaeger (3.7 cm Tak to Pz.Sfl.Ic): Development and Employment from 1927 to 1941 (Panzer Tracts No. 7-1) Boyds, Maryland: Panzer Tracts, 2004.  

World War II tank destroyers of Germany
Military vehicles introduced from 1940 to 1944